Thomas Eugene Hudson (born February 22, 1997) is an American football tight end who is a free agent. He played college football at Arizona State.

College career
Hudson was a member of the Arizona State Sun Devils for five seasons, redshirting his true freshman season. Over the course of his collegiate career, Hudson played in 40 games with 26 starts and caught 25 passes for 205 yards.

Professional career
Hudson signed with the Tennessee Titans as an undrafted free agent on May 4, 2020. He was waived at the end of training camp during final roster cuts on September 5, 2020, but was signed by to the team's practice squad the following day. On October 8, 2020 Hudson was suspended for six games for violating the NFL's policy on performance-enhancing substances. At the end of the season the Titans signed him to a reserve/futures contract.

Hudson was waived by the Titans on September 13, 2021 and re-signed to the practice squad. He was promoted to the active roster on September 24. He was placed on injured reserve on October 8, 2021. He was activated on November 20. He was placed back on injured reserve on December 11, ending his season.

On August 30, 2022, Hudson was waived/injured by the Titans and placed on injured reserve. He was released on October 4.

References

External links
Arizona State Sun Devils bio
Tennessee Titans bio

1997 births
Living people
Players of American football from San Jose, California
American football tight ends
Arizona State Sun Devils football players
Tennessee Titans players